The Chief of Army (AC) is the most senior appointment in the Swedish Army. The position Chief of Army was introduced in 1937 and the current form in 2014.

History
In 1937, the staff agency "Chief of the Army" (CA) was created to lead the army in peace time. The CA would under the King in Council exercise the highest military leadership of the Land Defense. At his side, the CA had an Army Staff to assist the CA in his duties. Before 1937 the Chief of the General Staff was considered to be the Chief of Army, but he was not usually to the rank of chief, but formally only the king's chief of staff in his capacity as Supreme Commander of the Swedish Armed Forces. The oldest general was chairman of the special preparatory body called the Generals Commission (Generalskommissionen).

Following a larger reorganization of the Swedish Armed Forces in 1994, the staff agency Chief of the Army ceased to exist as an independent agency. Instead, the post Chief of Army Command was created at the then newly instituted Swedish Armed Forces Headquarters. In 1998, the Swedish Armed Forces was again reorganized. Most of the duties of the Chief of Army Command were transferred to the newly instituted post of "Inspector General of the Army". The post is similar to that of the "Inspector General of the Swedish Navy" and the "Inspector General of the Swedish Air Force". It was later renamed to "Inspector of the Army" on 1 January 2003. The position of Inspector of the Army had previously been used in from 1942 to 1949 for the head of the Army Inspectorate (Arméinspektionen).

On 1 January 2014, the "Chief of Army" (AC) position was reinstated in the Swedish Armed Forces. The position has not the same duties as before.

Tasks
Tasks of the Chief of Army:

Lead the units which the Chief of Swedish Armed Forces Training and Development has distributed
To the Chief of Swedish Armed Forces Training and Development propose the development of the units' abilities
Being the foremost representative of the units
Represent the units and the area of ability in international contacts

Heraldry
The command flag of the Chief of Army is drawn by Brita Grep and embroidered by hand by the Kedja studio, Heraldica. Blazon: "Fessed in yellow and blue; on yellow two blue batons of command with sets of yellow crowns placed two and one in saltire, on blue two yellow swords in saltire."

List of chiefs

|-style="text-align:center;"
!colspan=8|Chief of the Army (Chefen för armén)

 

|-style="text-align:center;"
!colspan=7|Chief of Army Command (Chef för arméledningen)

|-style="text-align:center;"
!colspan=7|Inspector General of the Army (Generalinspektör för armén)

|-style="text-align:center;"
!colspan=7|Inspector of the Army (Arméinspektör)

|-style="text-align:center;"
!colspan=7|Chief of Army (Arméchef)

List of deputy chiefs

|-style="text-align:center;"
!colspan=7|Deputy Chief of Army (Ställföreträdande arméchef)

See also
Chief of Air Force (Sweden)
Chief of Navy (Sweden)

References

Notes

Print

Web

 
Sweden